Cancer: The Emperor of All Maladies is a 2015 American documentary film produced and directed by Barak Goodman and executive produced by Ken Burns. The film, in three episodes of two hours each, is based on the Pulitzer Prize-winning 2010 book The Emperor of All Maladies: A Biography of Cancer, by Siddhartha Mukherjee, and describes the history of cancer and cancer treatments, particularly in the United States.

The film is narrated by Edward Herrmann, who was himself suffering from terminal brain cancer at the time of its production. He died on December 31, 2014, three months before the film's release, making the series his final performance.

Episodes

Participants
The documentary film is narrated by Edward Herrmann, and includes the following participants:

Dr. Arnold Levine
 Sherwin Nuland
James P. Allison, episode 3
Dr. Bernard Fisher
Emil J. Freireich
Carl June
Howard Markel
Dr. Donald Pinkel
Dr. Eric Lander
Dr. James Holland
Dr. Jimmie Holland
Dr. Jose Baselga
Charles Sawyers
Dr. Lori Wilson
Dr. Robert Weinberg
John Bailar
Dr. Siddhartha Mukherjee
Dr. Sidney Farber
Dr. Susan Love
Dr. Suzanne Cole
Dr. Todd Golub
Dr. Vincent DeVita
Edward R. Murrow
Jerome Groopman
Mary Lasker

Gallery

Critical response
According to a review in the Los Angeles Times, the film is "the single most personally relevant documentary of this or any year". According to a review in The New York Times, the series is "absorbing", is "structured as an ever-evolving medical detective story, but the filmmakers give it heart as well by juxtaposing the history lessons with present-day personal profiles of cancer patients", seems perhaps "too much like a promotional video for cancer researchers and hospitals", and "touches only briefly on the significant issue of costs" but "achieves its main goal, which is to show the human impact of cancer."

See also

History of cancer
History of cancer chemotherapy
Human Genome Project

References

External links

Cancer: The Emperor of all Maladies on Ken Burns' website

2015 television films
2015 films
2015 documentary films
American documentary television films
Documentary films about United States history
Films set in the United States
Films shot in the United States
Films directed by Barak Goodman
2010s American films